Emilio Achacoso (born 17 May 1932) is a Filipino former basketball player who competed in the 1960 Summer Olympics.

Basketball career
Jun Achacoso was tops in his senior year at Mapua in 1954. He was named alternate in the 1954 Asian Games held in Manila but he was allowed to play a few games. His showing in the NCAA made coach Herr Silva field Jun in some games during the tournament. Right after he got his degree in Business Administration, he worked at the Development Bank and played with the Republic Supermarket Greyhounds in the MICAA.

After an indefinite suspension from the PAAF for accepting to play for the Chinese Black and White team in an Asian tour without permission was lifted in 1956, Jun went to play for the Philippine Air Lines in the MICAA. He failed to make it in the 1956 Melbourne Olympics. In 1958, Jun played for YCO Painters and made a good showing, this gave him the berth in the third Asian Games in Tokyo in the same year.

The next three years were memorable for Jun. He was a member of the 1959 RP team that saw action in the Chile world amateur championships. The following year, he made the Rome Olympics and the first Asian Basketball Confederation meet held in Manila.

In 1961, Jun retired for good when YCO was dethrone by Ysmael Steel as national champion.

References

External links
 

1932 births
Living people
Asian Games gold medalists for the Philippines
Asian Games medalists in basketball
Basketball players at the 1958 Asian Games
Medalists at the 1958 Asian Games
Basketball players at the 1960 Summer Olympics
Olympic basketball players of the Philippines
Philippines men's national basketball team players
Filipino men's basketball players
1959 FIBA World Championship players
Basketball players from Manila
Mapúa Cardinals basketball players